Three Married Men is a 1936 American comedy film directed by Edward Buzzell, written by Alan Campbell and Dorothy Parker, and starring Lynne Overman, William Frawley, Roscoe Karns, Mary Brian, George Barbier and Marjorie Gateson. It was released on September 24, 1936, by Paramount Pictures.

Plot

Cast  
Lynne Overman as Jeff Mullins
William Frawley as Bill Mullins
Roscoe Karns as Peter Cary
Mary Brian as Jennie Mullins
George Barbier as Mr. Cary
Marjorie Gateson as Clara
Benny Bartlett as Percy Mullins
Cora Sue Collins as Sue Cary
Mabel Colcord as Mrs. Mullins
Betty Ross Clarke as Annie
Gail Sheridan as Rose Cary
Donald Meek as Mr. Frisbee
Charles C. Wilson as Train Conductor

References

External links 
 

1936 films
1930s English-language films
Paramount Pictures films
American comedy films
1936 comedy films
Films directed by Edward Buzzell
American black-and-white films
1930s American films